The Craigmillar Festival Society (CFS) was a community arts organisation that existed in the Craigmillar area of Edinburgh, Scotland from 1962 to 2002. It is regarded as important contributor to the Community Arts Movement. Starting in 1967, many of its productions involved Craigmillar Castle.

Inception 
The Craigmillar Festival Committee was established in 1962, when a mothers group at Peffermill Primary School, south-east side of Edinburgh, created a Festival to celebrate local talent with the aid of then local councillor Jack Kane.

By 1962, Craigmillar was suffering from all the social ills of 20th century urban living and decay. The crunch came when the school's reply to a request for music lessons for her son from local mother Helen Crummy was ... "it takes us all our time to teach these children the 3Rs far less music." Biting their tongues the frustrated mothers in Peffermill School Mothers Club responded by knocking on doors, pulling out local talent and staging a People's Festival of music, drama, and the arts. The Festival was an instant success which brought joy, colour and fun to a drab and grey environment.

The festival married fun with passion for intensive political action. This led to politicians working not just for, but WITH, the local people. Combining culture with satirical criticism, the people wrote and produced their own community musicals and historical productions, basing them on the area's multitude of social concerns and issues.

Growth and development 
In 1970 the Craigmillar Festival Committee gained official recognition, charitable status and changed its name to the Craigmillar Festival Society (CFS).  By 1976 the Society was employing 600 people and involving 1500 volunteers.  That year, 17000 people either took part or attended the annual festival. By this time, it had received a major anti-poverty research grant from The European Community.

A prime example of what the CFS did in the community was through the tireless work of the Bingham neighbourhood worker Claire Elder. In 1970, she persuaded some neighbours to go dressed as a gypsy tribe to the Mediaeval Fayre. Later calling themselves the Bingham Belles, they formed a drama and music group and became stars of the Festival's Old Tyme Musical Hall. Entertaining in and beyond Craigmillar, they successfully campaigned to obtain much needed amenities for Bingham, including their own community centre and youth facilities.

Several CFS workers AND volunteers who came from AND lived in the community went on to become teachers and trainers of the CFS ethic in their later lives with other organisations and even government quangoes. But they were first and foremost at the heart of the CFS activities in the community.

The CFS created and developed many concepts including Communiversity, Arts As The Catalyst, Creative Shared Government, Neighbourhood Workers Scheme and the hugely influential planning document "The Comprehensive Plan for Action" where Art and culture were the catalyst in all aspects of regeneration.

One of the CFS founders, Helen Crummy created an MBE in 1973 (later awarded an honorary doctorate), produced a book called "Let The People Sing" that provides an account of the background and development of the CFS.

Achievements 

Many artists, politicians and researchers came to Craigmillar, either to see or become involved in the community activities. Each of these have taken the seed and rooted it worldwide, from The Easterhouse Festival Society, Notting Hill Carnival and also in the work of Neil Cameron and Reg Bolton in Australia. Craigmillar Festival Society helped create many things, amongst them; The Mermaid Sculpture by Pedro Silva; The Gentle Giant Sculpture by Jimmy Boyle; The Bill Douglas Trilogy, in particular "My Childhood" (funded by British Film Institute).

The Craigmillar Festival Society was the recognised leader in the production of The Community Musical theatre productions, where professional actors worked very closely with local people. In effect, since 1962, local people came together and produced well over 100 productions. From 1973's first Community Musical "The Time Machine", 1974's "Castle, Cooncil & Curse, 1975's "Time and Motion Man", 1976's "Willie Wynn", 1977's Culture Vultures" and 1978's "Oh Gentle Giant", to the 1980s with "Shoo", "For A' That & A' That", "Dampbusters" and "Watch It", the 1990s and "Fit For Heroes", "Kicking Up A Stink" and "In Your Dreams" and the more recent "Grease Niddrie Style". All included songs such  as "Craigmillar Now", "When People Play Their Part", "Arled Bairn", "Candy Barrie" and "He Promised Me".

Many local people who began performing in Community productions went on to become successful professional performers, Alice Henderson and Johnni Stanton, who went on to form their own companies, but most notably, Faye Milligan (The Steamie), and James (Micky) MacPherson, whose company Plum Films won a BAFTA award. Both returned to Craigmillar and directed local productions.

Craigmillar was at the forefront of the Golden Age of artistic expansion in Edinburgh in the early 70s and helped to create several lasting institutions, among them, Theatre Workshop Edinburgh.

It also has links with Professor Eric Trist and The Tavistock Institute, Billy Connolly, Richard Demarco, Anne Lorne Gillies, Joan Bakewell, Michael Marra and Bill Paterson.

Commentary 
The effectiveness of the Society's work began to be noticed from both near and far with distinguished commentators making reference to it.

The Social Impact of Participation in the Arts Seminar, 1997 at The House of the Art Lover, Glasgow, organised by Scottish Arts Council, chaired by Seona Reid, Director.
Donald Campbell (Cities of the imagination/Edinburgh, 2003, Signal Books)
Eric Trist (New directions of hope, 1979)
Eric Trist (QWL Quality of Working Life and the 80's (The Closing Address to the International Conference on QWL and the 80's, Harbour Castle Hilton, Toronto, 30 August – 3 September 1981)
Rafael Ramirez (The Beauty of Social Organization, Accedo, Munich, 1991)
Alan Barnett (Community Murals, The Peoples Art, 1984, Associated University Press)
Malcolm McEwen (‘The Other Edinburgh’, New Statesman, 18 August 1972.)
George McRobie (Small Is Possible, London: Jonathan Cape, 1981 — this is part of the E. F. Schumacher Small Is Beautiful trilogy)
Kenneth Calman (Arts The Catalyst, Craigmillar Communiversity Press, 2004)
from ‘A GIANT STEP’ An Appraisal of The Craigmillar Festival Society's Approach to Community Development, Relative to the Craigmillar (European Economic Community Programme of Pilot Schemes and Studies to Combat Poverty, Abstract, p. 6. By M Stephen Burgess in consultation with Eric Trist November, 1980.)
Professor Albert Cherns of Loughborough University (in a letter to the Michael Young Rt. Hon. Lord Young of Dartington, 2 August 1982)
Dr. Helen Wood (‘Festivity and Social Change’, Leisure in the 80's Research Unit, Department of Social Sciences, Polytechnic of the South Bank, London Road, London SE1, December, 1982)
Charles Landry and Franois Matarasso (Art of Regeneration, Comedia, 1996)
David Harding, Head of Environmental Art and Sculpture (1985–2001), Glasgow School of Art. (Art with People, AN Publications, 1994.)
David Harding (Arts The Catalysts, Craigmillar Communiversity Press, 2004)

It has also been compared to The Peckham Experiment and Bromley by Bow Centre and The Healthy Living Centre concept. In recent years The Bromley by Bow Centre has taken up The Communiversity concept to develop its education programme.

Into the future  
By 2002 after a public investigation into alleged improper use of funding, funding was cut off and the remaining CFS projects were made independent organizations. Although the original CFS organization is now defunct, its spirit lives on within the community and it continues to attract attention through the "Arts As A Catalyst" Exhibition at The City Arts Centre, Edinburgh in 2004 and an award-winning documentary, which won The Saltire Award at The Edinburgh International Film Festival in 2005.
The local arts scene is also kept alive by two community organisations currently existing within the community, Craigmillar Community Arts, who provide a variety of arts based projects at Craigmillar Arts Centre on Newcraighall Road and the Greater Craigmillar Archives who are devoted to recording and preserving a physical and digital record of the Craigmillar community through the years.

See also 
 Community art
 Not-for-profit arts organization
 Niddrie, Edinburgh

References

External links
A Pictorial History
British Film Institute
Top 20 Scottish films of all time

Organisations based in Edinburgh
Arts organizations established in 1962
Arts organizations disestablished in 2002
Scottish art
Culture in Edinburgh
Arts festivals in Scotland